K144 or K-144 may refer to:

K-144 (Kansas highway), a state highway in Kansas
HMS Meadowsweet (K144), a former UK Royal Navy ship